Science Publishing Group (SPG) is an open-access publisher of academic journals and books established in 2012. It has an address in New York City but is actually based in Pakistan. The company has been criticized for predatory publishing practices.  it publishes 430 journals in various fields.

SPG uses a Gold open-access model of publishing which charges the authors. The company claims that articles are peer reviewed by scientific experts before publication. In October 2022,  most to all of its journals did not have a scientific editor-in-chief.

Criticism of publishing practices 
The company has been criticized for predatory open-access publishing. 

In an experiment, university professor Fiona McQuarrie submitted an article to International Journal of  Astrophysics and Space Science from Science Publishing Group, using pseudonyms "Maggie Simpson" and "Edna Krabappel" (characters from the cartoon series The Simpsons). Although the article had been generated by the SCIgen computer program and was nonsense, it was accepted for publication. Librarian Jeffrey Beall, creator of a list of predatory open-access publishers, cites a nonsensical article in American Journal of Applied Mathematics, containing an alleged proof of Buddhist . 

Science Publishing Group has also been cited more directly as a predatory journal and a scam, using more than 200 pseudo-publications like American Journal of Applied Mathematics or International Journal of Transportation Engineering and Technology. The publisher uses techniques related to scam like aggressive emailing (spamming campaigns) with replaced characters (α for a, for example) or invitations to publish in exchange for a payment in order to fool unsuspecting scholars.

List of journals
SPG publishes hundreds of journals. Many are named American Journal of... or European Journal of... despite SPG being based in Pakistan.

References

Academic publishing companies
Open access publishers
Publishing companies based in New York City
Publishing companies of Pakistan
Publishing companies established in 2012